The Times are a British indie band, the brainchild of Ed Ball, co-founder member of the Television Personalities, Teenage Filmstars and 'O' Level.

Whaam! Records 1981–1982 

After releasing a string of 7-inch singles variously as O'Level ("We Love Malcolm", 1978), The Television Personalities ("Part-Time Punks", 1978), Teenage Filmstars ("There's A Cloud Over Liverpool", 1979, "I Helped Patrick McGoohan Escape", 1980), that culminated with the debut Television Personalities album "And Don't The Kids Just Love It" (1980) on Rough Trade Records, Edward Ball and Daniel Treacy opted for even more artistic control by setting up their own label, WHAAM! Records.

At the same time, recorded as a proposed Teenage Filmstars' debut LP, Ball's 1980 collection of songs was completed as "Go! With The Times", from which the first Times single "Red With Purple Flashes" (1981) was released on Whaam! This was followed by "Pop Goes Art!" (1982), released in individually hand-painted sleeves that executed the band's Pop Art visions.

ArTpOp! Records 1982–1986 
On leaving the Television Personalities, and consequently Whaam!, Ball immediately launched the ARTPOP! label with the Times' second single "I Helped Patrick McGoohan Escape!" (September 1982). This was accompanied by humorous tongue in cheek video based on "The Prisoner" T.V. series that starred Patrick McGoohan. Ball's songwriting took a more serious turn with "This Is London" (1983). Songs like "Goodbye Piccadilly", "If Only", and the title track, match the bleakness and despair of Joy Division, the cutting sarcasm of The Jam. After the experimental electronics of "Hello Europe" (1984), Ball fulfilled a long-time ambition to stage Joe Orton's screenplay for the Beatles "Up Against It" at a West London theatre with Tony Conway from Mood Six. This culminated with the Times' fifth album "Up Against It" (1985). Fancying themselves as pirate televisionaries, the Times proceeded by decimating in fiction, within the parameters of songwriting, every symbol of western civilisation with their final ARTPOP! album "Enjoy".

Creation Records 1988–1999 
Given the opportunity by Alan McGee to continue recording his skewed visions as The Times, Edward Ball released "Beat Torture" (1988). "E For Edward" (1989) and "Et Dieu Créa La Femme" (1990), recalls his various abilities to humourise fads and trends ("Manchester", "Aurore Boreale"), register sadness and loss ("No Love On Haight Street", "All Your Life") and generally capture the enveloping drug culture that pervaded the label. "Pure" (1991), which contains a 12-minute version of New Order's "Blue Monday" in French ("Lundi Bleu"), sees Ball plunging into his own psyche to create an undisciplined record. Cited by some as the most psychedelic record of the 90s, it reveals the male aspects of group culture ("From Chelsea Green To Brighton Beach") and female distortions and rants ("Another Star In Heaven"), including a performance by Ball's Mum. "Alternative Commercial Crossover" (1993) suggests he is still susceptible to the psychedelics – his combining of James Joyce with Raggamuffin culture ("Finnegan's Break") is a hit-and-miss affair. The album's strength lies in Ball's melodic and sensitive delivery ("All I Want is You to Care", "Sorry I've Written A Melody") that signposts his destiny as a solo artist. "Sad But True" (1997) and "Pirate Playlist 66" (1999) function as secondary tiers to Edward Ball's solo output.

Discography

Studio albums 
 Go! with the Times (November 1980 but released in 1985) [Reissued 2006 with extra tracks]
 Pop Goes Art! (January 1982) [Reissued 2008 with extra tracks]
 This Is London (May 1983) [Reissued 2006 with extra tracks]
 Hello Europe (September 1984)
 Up Against It (January 1986)
 Enjoy the Times (December 1986)
 Beat Torture (November 1988)
 E for Edward (October 1989)
 Et Dieu Créa La Femme (August 1990)
 Pure (August 1990)
 The Times at the Astradome Lunaville (April 1992)
 Alternative Commercial Crossover (April 1993)
 Sad But True (March 1997)
 Pirate Playlist (December 1999)

Compilations 
 Pink Ball Brown Ball Ed Ball – July 1991
 Welcome to the Wonderful World of Ed Ball – March 1995
 Here's to Old England! – October 2005

EPs 
 I Helped Patrick McGoohan Escape (November 1983) [Reissued 2006 with extra tracks]
Blue Period (March 1985)
 Boys About Town EP – 12-inch, Artpop! (1985)
 Times TV – 12-inch, Fire Records (1986)

Singles 
"Red with Purple Flashes" – 7-inch, Whaam! (1981)
"Here Comes the Holidays" – 7-inch, Artpop! (1982 – A-side credited to Joni Dee featuring The Times)
"I Helped Patrick McGoohan Escape" – 7-inch, Artpop! (1982)
"Boys Brigade" – 7-inch, Artpop! (1984)
"Blue Fire" – 7-inch, Artpop! (1984)
"London Boys" – 7-inch, Unicorn (1986)
"Times TV" – 7-inch, Fire Records (1986)
"Manchester" – 12-inch/CD, Creation Records (1990)
"The Mods Are Back!" – split 7-inch, Caff Corporation (1990)
"Lundi Bleu" – 7-inch/12"/CD, Creation Records (1992)
"Finnegan's Break" – 7-inch/12", Creation Records (1993)
"Baby Girl" – 7-inch/CD, Creation Records (1993)

Compilation appearances 
 A Splash of Colour – "I Helped Patrick McGoohan Escape" (1981), WEA Records
 The Countdown Compilation (5-4-3-2-1 Go!) – "Whatever Happened to Thames Beat" (1985), Countdown

See also 
Ed Ball (musician)
Creation Records
Television Personalities

References

External links 
The Times and Edward Ball page at Television Personalities site
The Times' Myspace
Myspace page on 'Up Against It'
Myspace page on 'E for Edward'

English post-punk music groups
Creation Records artists
Musical groups established in 1980
Musical groups from London
British indie pop groups
English indie rock groups